There are several rivers named Curuá River in Brazil:

 Curuá River (Amazon River tributary)
 Curuá River (Iriri River tributary)
 Curuá River (Mato Grosso)
 Curuá Una River
 Curuá do Sul River

See also
 Curuá, a municipality in the state of Pará, Brazil